A cellone is a large cello invented in 1882 by the German luthier Alfred Stelzner. It is held like a cello but tuned (high-to-low) to E A D G, a fourth below the cello and two octaves below the violin. Its music is written in the bass clef. Its body length and its breadth slightly exceeds those of a normal cello, but it sounds much deeper than a normal cello.

It is rarely used by composers. One of the few works where it is used is the Sextet in D major for violino piccolo, violin, viola, violotta, cello, and cellone, Op. 68, by Arnold Krug.

See also 
Tenor violin
Viola Profonda
Violin octet

References

Discography 
2005: Homage to Stelzner. CD. AK Coburg DR 0010. (Contains music by Felix Draeseke and Arnold Krug)

Cellos